Israel competed at the 2001 World Championships in Athletics from 3 August and 12 August in Edmonton, Alberta, Canada.

Medalists 
The following competitors from Israel won medals at the Championships

Men's pole vault

Qualification - Group A
7 August

Final
9 August

Men's 100 metres

Heats

Quarterfinals

Men's 4 × 100 metres relay

Heats

Semifinals

Men's marathon

Intermediates

Final ranking

Women's 100 metres hurdles

Heats

Men's triple jump

Qualification

Men's javelin throw

Qualification - Group A

References

2001
Nations at the 2001 World Championships in Athletics
World Championships in Athletics